Dennis Frederic "Dinny" Fagan (17 March 1906 – 18 September 1990) was an Australian rules footballer who played for South Melbourne in the Victorian Football League (VFL).

Notes

External links 

1906 births
1990 deaths
VFL/AFL players born outside Australia
Australian rules footballers from Victoria (Australia)
Sydney Swans players
Moorabbin Football Club players